Orthogoniinae is a subfamily of ground beetles (family Carabidae). Occasionally it was treated as a tribe Orthogoniini of subfamily Harpalinae, particularly when this was circumscribed loosely.

It contains  the following genera:

 Tribe Amorphomerini Sloane, 1923
 Amorphomerus Sloane, 1923
 Tribe Idiomorphini Bates, 1891
 Idiomorphus Chaudoir, 1846
 Rathymus Dejean, 1831
 Strigia Brullé, 1835
 Perochnoristhus Basilewsky, 1973
 Tribe Orthogoniini Schaum, 1857
 Glyptus Brullé, 1837
 Neoglyptus Basilewsky, 1953
 Actenoncus Chaudoir, 1872
 Anoncopeucus Chaudoir, 1872
 Hexachaetus Chaudoir, 1872
 Neoorthogonius Tian & Deuve, 2006
 Nepalorthogonius Habu, 1979
 Orthogonius W.S.MacLeay, 1825

References

 
Beetle subfamilies